William Walcot  (10 March 1874 – 21 May 1943) was a Scottish architect, graphic artist and etcher, notable as a practitioner of refined Art Nouveau (Style Moderne) in Moscow, Russia (as Вильям Францевич Валькот). His trademark Lady's Head keystone ornament became the easily recognisable symbol of Russian Style Moderne. In 1920s–1930s, he concentrated on graphic art and was praised as "the best architectural draftsman" in London.

Biography

Russia

William Walcot was born at Lustdorf, near Odessa in a mixed Scottish-Russian family. He grew up in Western Europe and South Africa, returning to Russia at the age of 17, and studied arts and architecture under Leon Benois at the Imperial Academy of Arts in Saint Petersburg. Later, he attended art schools in Paris. Walcot's career as an architect in Moscow lasted only six years, but he managed to leave a lasting heritage of refined, pure Art Nouveau. Unlike contemporary architects like Fyodor Schechtel, Walcot never ventured into Neo-Gothic or Russian Revival styles – his work is strictly Art Nouveau, in its English Decadent variety (according to contemporary Russian critics). 

His largest and best known work was the Hotel Metropol in Moscow, financed by Savva Mamontov. The spacious building, now operating as a hotel only, was conceived as a cultural center around Private Opera hall. In 1899, Walcot applied to the open contest with a draft codenamed A Lady's Head (Женская головка), earning the fourth prize and losing to Lev Kekushev. However, Mamontov discarded the professional jury decision, and awarded the design to Walcot (Lev Kekushev later joined the team as project manager). More than once, Walcot's original plans were changed in the process; in fact, there is little in common between the extant building and his 1899 draft (Brumfield, fig.56) – but the Lady's Head persisted in the main hall ornaments. The building, completed in 1905 after a devastating fire in 1901, was decorated by Mikhail Vrubel, Alexander Golovin, Nikolai Andreev and other artists. Participation of Victor Vesnin and Fyodor Schechtel, suggested by William Brumfield, has not been confirmed.

Lady's Head became Walcot's trademark, repeated in his later works (usually in place of an arch keystone), and frequently imitated by local craftsmen. For a while, he enjoyed an unprecedented flow of inquiries and secured two high-profile commissions of his own choice. These buildings, soon occupied by foreign embassies, are well maintained and retain most of their original interiors:

1899–1900 Yakunchikova House (Prechistensky lane, 10)
1902–1903 Gutheil House (Prechistensky lane, 8, Embassy of Morocco)

Walcot's mosaic, signed W.W., adorns the List House in Glazovsky Lane, built by Lev Kekushev.

Walcot's 1902 draft for the Lutheran Cathedral in Moscow won the contest, but the cathedral was eventually built to another architect's design. Walcot published various drafts in architectural magazines, influencing many local architects (Brumfield, fig.58).

In 1904, Walcot lost the contest for the Polytechnical Society Building in Myasnitskaya Street to Adolph Mincus; the building, completed in 1905–1907 by Alexander Kuznetsov (1874–1954), bears some details from Walcot's rejected draft.

United Kingdom

In 1906, Walcot relocated to London. There he was initially employed as a draughtsman for the South African architect Eustace Frere. He rarely returned to practical construction, designing only one London building: 61 St James's Street (1933). Rather, Walcot worked as an architectural draftsman, famous for his artistic presentation of other architects' designs and exhibiting his own work at the Royal Academy summer exhibitions.

Walcot, along with contemporary Cyril Farey, was one of the most sought after English architectural illustrators of the 1920s and 30s. Walcot developed his own impressionistic style in gouache and watercolour which won numerous commissions from Edwin Lutyens, Herbert Baker and Aston Webb. He also engaged in printmaking, creating reconstructions of ancient Greek, Roman, Babylonian and Egyptian buildings. A folio of his work was published in 1919 as Architectural Watercolours and Etchings of William Walcot. He was elected to the Royal Society of British Artists in 1913, as an associate of the Royal Society of Painter-Etchers and Engravers in 1916 and a Fellow of the RIBA in 1922. He was also an associate of the British School at Rome.

Walcot's successful practice was ruined with the outbreak of World War II, and, in 1943, Walcot committed suicide at Hurstpierpoint, Sussex. Walcot's painting and etchings are frequently exhibited; his painting palette is preserved at the Royal Institute of British Architects. He had a retrospective exhibition at the Fine Arts Society in 1974.

References
William Craft Brumfield, The Origins of Modernism in Russian Architecture, University of California Press, 1991 chapter 3
William Walcot exh. cat., London, F.A. Soc., 1974
G. Stamp: The Great Perspectivists, London, 1982

Further reading

Architectural water-colours & etchings of William Walcot (London: H.C. Dickins, 1919).
Salaman, M.C. (intro) (1927), Modern Masters of Etching: William Walcot, R.E., 'The Studio' Limited, London.
William Walcot, An Architect-Etcher and quintessential artist of the Modern British Etching Boom. By Elizabeth Harvey-Lee. A history and on-line exhibition of Walcot's work.

External links

Photograph of Walcot and historical photographs of Metropol Hotel
Gutheil House photos
Yakunchikova House photos, floorplan

Art Nouveau architects
20th-century British architects
British draughtsmen
British watercolourists
British etchers
Architects from Odesa
1874 births
1943 deaths
20th-century British painters
British male painters
Russian people of Scottish descent
Architects from Moscow
20th-century British printmakers
Architectural illustrators
Emigrants from the Russian Empire to the United Kingdom
1943 suicides
Suicides in England
20th-century British male artists